Martha Dübber was a German film editor. She worked on more than eighty productions between 1930 and 1962.

Selected filmography
 Kohlhiesel's Daughters (1930)
 24 Hours in the Life of a Woman (1931)
 The Escape to Nice (1932)
 The House of Dora Green (1933)
 At the Strasbourg (1934)
 Paganini (1934)
 A Woman of No Importance (1936)
 The Ruler (1937)
 Dance on the Volcano (1938)
 Robert Koch (1939)
 Die Entlassung (1942)
 Gaspary's Sons (1948)
 The Prisoner (1949)
 I'll Never Forget That Night (1949)
 The Beautiful Galatea (1950)
 This Man Belongs to Me (1950)
 The Lie (1950)
 Taxi-Kitty (1950)
 Sensation in San Remo (1951)
 Professor Nachtfalter (1951)
 The Csardas Princess (1951)
 Klettermaxe (1952)
 Weekend in Paradise (1952)
 We'll Talk About Love Later (1953)
 Red Roses, Red Lips, Red Wine (1953)
 The Rose of Stamboul (1953)
 Life Begins at Seventeen (1953)
 The Private Secretary (1953)
 The Little Czar (1954)
 My Sister and I (1954)
 The Big Star Parade (1954)
 Ball at the Savoy (1955)
 Music, Music and Only Music (1955)
 Three Girls from the Rhine (1955)
 Three Days Confined to Barracks (1955)
 Tired Theodore (1957)
 Aunt Wanda from Uganda (1957)
 Widower with Five Daughters (1957)
 Escape from Sahara (1958)
 Father, Mother and Nine Children (1958)
 Night Nurse Ingeborg (1958)
 Triplets on Board (1959)
 The Last Pedestrian (1960)
 Barbara (1961)
 The Gypsy Baron (1962)
 Her Most Beautiful Day (1962)

External links 
 

Year of birth missing
Year of death missing
German film editors
German women film editors